Twin Groves Wind Farm is a wind farm in the U.S. state of Illinois, near the villages of Arrowsmith, Saybrook, and Ellsworth in McLean County. It consists of 240 operating wind turbines. Each wind turbine stands 280 ft (80 m) tall and has three 120-foot-long (39 m) blades. The wind farm was constructed from 2007 to February 2008. Twin Groves was the largest utility-scale wind farm east of the Mississippi River upon completion.

Description
The Twin Groves Wind Farm lies in eastern McLean County just east of Bloomington on Illinois State Route 9. The wind farm consists of 240 Vestas 1.65 MW wind turbines and is owned and operated by EDP Renewables North America. Total cost of Twin Groves was approximately $700 million. The current total capacity at Twin Groves Wind Farm is 398 megawatts. The site produces enough power to power about 120,000 homes, or approximately 1.3 billion kilowatt hours annually.

Revenue
Between , or 1%, of the total 22,000 acres will be taken up by the turbines. Royalties are paid to owners of the land at $5,000 per wind turbine. The wind farm pays property taxes, of which Ridgeview School District will start collecting $300,000 a year, while Tri-Valley School District will collect between $200,000-$250,000 a year.

Future
With 240 wind turbines already generating power, the project owner is considering an additional 170 wind turbines, to bring the total number of turbines to 410. Test wind turbines are being placed in eastern McLean County to determine if additional wind turbines can be supported. If constructed, power capacity estimates for the wind farm increase from 396 megawatts to 680 megawatts.

Electricity production

See also

List of wind farms
Wind power in the United States

References

External links
Video of turbines in action (requires Adobe Flash)
Twin Groves Wind Farm official site
Prairie Fire: Twin Groves Wind Farm (WILL-TV)

Energy infrastructure completed in 2008
Buildings and structures in McLean County, Illinois
Wind farms in Illinois